You Make Me Feel may refer to:

 You Make Me Feel (Bonfire album), 2009
 You Make Me Feel (Milosh album), 2004
 "You Make Me Feel" (AnnaGrace song), 2008
 "You Make Me Feel (Mighty Real)", song by Sylvester
 "You Make Me Feel...", song by Cobra Starship
 "(You Make Me Feel Like) A Natural Woman", song by Aretha Franklin, with many covers
 "You Make Me Feel", song by Kylie Minogue from the album Body Language
 "You Make Me Feel", song by Westlife from the album Coast to Coast

See also